The former Rydal Bank Church, also known as the Rydal Bank Presbyterian Church and the Rydal Bank United Church, is an historic Carpenter Gothic-style church building located at 1634 Highway 638, in Rydal Bank in the township of Plummer Additional, north of Bruce Mines, Ontario, Canada. Completed in 1908, its wooden frame exterior, corner entry-bell tower, steep pitched roof and lancet windows are typical of Carpenter Gothic style churches. It was built to serve a Presbyterian congregation which joined the United Church of Canada in 1925 when that new denomination was formed.

The church closed in 1978 and was bought in 1989 by the Rydal Bank Historical Society which has restored it and maintains it as a museum named the Rydal Bank Community Hall and Church. A church service is held once a year and the building is also available for weddings and other events.

The church is a municipal heritage site as designated by Plummer Additional on November 22, 2006.

Affiliations
The Museum is affiliated with: CMA,  CHIN, and Virtual Museum of Canada.

References

External links
 Ontario Museum association - Listing for Rydal Bank Community Hall and Church

Carpenter Gothic church buildings in Ontario
Museums in Algoma District
United Church of Canada churches in Ontario
Designated heritage properties in Ontario
History museums in Ontario
20th-century United Church of Canada church buildings